XHSS-FM is a radio station on 91.9 FM in San Luis Potosí, San Luis Potosí. It is owned by Grupo AS and carries its La Poderosa grupera format.

History
XHSS received its concession on November 28, 1988. It was owned by Radiorama through subsidiary Voz y Música, S.A., but was regularly farmed out to other radio groups.

In 2002, MG Radio began operating the station with Romance, a romantic format. In early 2006, Radio S.A. tried its hand at running XHSS, placing its Máxima pop format on the station. MG Radio returned to XHSS in January 2008, restoring the Romance name and format; two years later, that moved to XESL-AM 1340 as Radiorama retook control of XHSS.

The first format on the station after Radiorama took control was Xtrema, a pop format. On March 1, 2016, XHSS picked up the La Poderosa grupera format.

References

Radio stations in San Luis Potosí